Jan Vayne (pseudonym of Jan Veenje) (June 9, 1966 in Zuidwolde, Drenthe) is a Dutch pianist. He began piano lessons at the age of 4 years and by the time he was 10, he had won his first prize. In 1984 Vayne began his study at the conservatorium in Zwolle and he graduated with a soloist diploma. He received much acclaim after several appearances on Dutch television talk shows.

He has made several CDs and has given many concerts. In 1997 he was invited to perform a concert in the Folger Shakespeare Library in Washington DC to honour President William Clinton's second-term inauguration.

Vayne has in the past worked with DJ and producer Armin van Buuren. Together they made the album Classical Trancelations that is a mixture of trance and classical music.

Jan Vayne regularly gives concerts in collaboration with symphony orchestras, ensembles, musicians, vocalists, harmony orchestras and choirs.
In more recent times, Vayne performs together with organist/composer Martin Mans and singer Petra Berger.

Vayne was married with Joyce Wegman and they have a daughter, Olivia born in 2006.

Trivia

 Vayne is a vegetarian and was a candidate for the sexiest vegetarian in the country.
 He is a big car enthusiast. Especially classic American cars with high horse power, six-liter engines and with eight cylinders. 
 He owns a former Messonite church, the Sint Annakapel (Saint Anna Chapel) built in 1470 and situated on the Broederweg in Kampen. It functions as a romantic marriage location.
 Vayne's trademark is his long hair. This was once the subject of a rather successful television advertisement for a shampoo and smoked sausage  product.

Albums

References

1966 births
Living people
20th-century Dutch pianists
Dutch pianists
Musicians from Drenthe
People from De Wolden
Pseudonymous artists